Ifaistos Limnou B.C. (also known as: Ifestos Limnou B.C. or Hephaestus Lemnos B.C.) (Greek: Ήφαιστος Λήμνου K.A.E.) was a Greek professional basketball club that was based on the Greek island of Lemnos, in Myrina. The club was named after the Greek god Hephaestus.

History
Foinix Larissas was replaced in its Greek competition by Gymnastikos S. Larissas, after the two clubs merged in 2015, thus ending Foinix's presence in Greek basketball competitions. The club played in the  3rd-tier level Greek B League during the 2015–16 season, and was promoted to the 2nd-tier level Greek A2 League, for the 2016–17 season.

In the summer of 2017, Gymnastikos then merged with Faros Keratsiniou, and then took Faros' place in the upcoming top-tier level Greek Basket League's 2017–18 season. Faros retained all of its amateur and junior clubs. Gymnastikos' club name then officially became Gymnastikos Syllogos Larissas Faros 2017, abbreviated as G.S.L. Faros 2017.

Ifaistos Lemnou was then officially created on 25 October 2017, under the ownership of Pantelis Boumbouras, and being based in Myrina, on the Greek island of Lemnos. In July 2018, Ifaistos merged with GSL Faros. After the merger of the two clubs, GSL Faros' club history was then returned to the club, which was re-named to Gymnastikos S. Larissas 1928. The club played its first official game against Peristeri, on 3 October 2018, in the Round 16 phase of the Greek Cup. Ifaistos lost the game, by a score of 91–81.

After the end of the 2019–20 Greek Basket League season, the club was disbanded.

Arena
The club played its home games at the 1,260 seat capacity Nikos Samaras Indoor Hall, which is located in Myrina, on the Greek Island of Lemnos. The arena is named after the late Greek volleyball player Nikos Samaras.

Season by season

Notable players

Greece:
 Dimitris Charitopoulos
 Georgios Diamantakos
 Costis Gontikas
 Sotirios Manolopoulos
 Spyros Mourtos
 Michalis Pelekanos
 Dimitris Stamatis
 Michalis Tsairelis

Europe:
 Rolands Freimanis
 Vlad Moldoveanu

USA:
 Tyrone Brazelton
 Sean Evans
 Marcus Gilbert
 Toddrick Gotcher
 Cliff Hammonds
 Mario Little
 Jerry Smith
 Antwaine Wiggins

Head coaches

 Sotiris Manolopoulos

References

External links 
Official website  
Greek Basket League Profile 

Basketball teams established in 2017
Basketball teams in Greece
Lemnos
Basketball teams disestablished in 2020